The Association of Christian College Athletics (ACCA) is an organization of collegiate athletics in the United States. It was incorporated to provide an opportunity for smaller Christian college members to compete on an equal level of competition with schools of like size.

History
The ACCA was established in 1983 as the "National Bible College Athletic Association" (NBCAA) to provide a national organization to hold championships, name All-Americans, scholar athletes and promote member colleges. The name was changed to the Association of Christian College Athletics (ACCA) in June 2004. A commissioner was hired and a plan for membership growth was established.

The aim of the ACCA is to promote the education and development of students through intercollegiate athletic participation.

Sports

Member schools

Championships

Fall sports

Winter sports

Women's basketball

Men's basketball

|2023
|Kansas Christian College
|

References

External links
 

Association of Christian College Athletics member schools
College sports conferences in the United States
Christian universities and colleges
Christian sports organizations
College sports governing bodies in the United States
1983 establishments in the United States
Sports organizations established in 1983